Chubbuck is a surname. Notable people with the surname include:

 Byron Chubbuck (born 1967), American bank robber
 Christine Chubbuck (1944–1974), television reporter
 Emily Chubbuck (1817–1854), American poet
 Ivana Chubbuck, acting coach

See also
 Chubbuck, Idaho